Matjaž Kek (born 9 September 1961) is a Slovenian professional football manager and former player who is the manager of the Slovenia national team.

Playing career
Kek started his career at his home club NK Maribor, before moving to another Maribor-based team, Železničar Maribor. In 1980, he returned to Maribor. In 1985 he joined the Austrian club Spittal/Drau, where he stayed for three seasons. Kek then transferred to another Austrian club, GAK of the Austrian Bundesliga where he played for seven years. After that, he returned to Maribor, where between 1995 and 1999 he won three Slovenian league titles, before retiring. Overall, Kek made 280 appearances for Maribor in all competitions over the span of eleven seasons. He spent most of his career playing in defense, mostly in the centre-back position and was known for his leadership abilities.

Managerial career

Maribor
After finishing his career as a player, Kek stayed at Maribor, serving as an assistant manager for one season, before being appointed as manager in March 2000 after Bojan Prašnikar left the club. He immediately won the league title in the 1999–2000 season. He resigned in September 2000 after a 3–1 defeat against Korotan Prevalje. In October 2001, Kek returned to Maribor as an interim manager after Ivo Šušak resigned. A couple weeks later, he was moved to the assistant manager position after Bojan Prašnikar took over the managerial role. In September 2002, he once again became a manager of the team, and won the league title in the 2002–03 season. Kek was sacked by the team on 20 September 2004 after a string of poor results.

Slovenia national team
Between 2006 and 2007, Kek was the head coach of the Slovenian under-15 and under-16 national teams. On 5 January 2007, Kek was appointed manager of the Slovenia national team, which he led to the 2010 FIFA World Cup after beating Russia in the play-off. On 24 October 2011, after the unsuccessful UEFA Euro 2012 qualifications, Kek and the Football Association of Slovenia came to a mutual agreement on the early termination of his contract. He was succeeded by Slaviša Stojanović.

Al-Ittihad
On 20 December 2011, Kek became the head coach of Saudi Arabian club Al-Ittihad, however, his brief encounter with the Arabian football finished abruptly when he was sacked less than two months later, on 8 February 2012.

Rijeka
On 27 February 2013, after more than a year without contract, Kek took over Croatian top division club HNK Rijeka. He led Rijeka to the group stage of the UEFA Europa League in both the 2013–14 and 2014–15 seasons. In the 2016–17 season, Kek led Rijeka to their first-ever championship title and the historic double. He also won the 2013–14 and 2016–17 editions of the Croatian Cup, as well as the 2014 Croatian Super Cup. In the 2013–14, 2014–15 and 2015–16 seasons of the Croatian First League, Rijeka finished as the runners-up. With over five years at the club, Kek holds numerous club records, including for most wins and appearances for a manager. On 24 October 2016, he became Rijeka's longest-serving manager by single appointment. In June 2017, Kek signed a new three-year contract with Rijeka, which ties him with the club until June 2020. On 7 September 2017, Kek became the longest-serving manager by single appointment in the history of the Croatian First Football League. He resigned on 6 October 2018 after a 2–1 defeat against HNK Gorica.

Return to the national team
On 27 November 2018, Kek was appointed as the manager of Slovenia for the second time in his career, replacing caretaker manager Igor Benedejčič. He managed the team in the UEFA Euro 2020 qualifiers, where Slovenia finished in fourth place with four wins out of ten games. In 2020, Slovenia went undefeated for a record eight consecutive games, and also finished first in Group 3 of the 2020–21 UEFA Nations League C and was thus promoted to League B.

Personal life
Matjaž's father, Franc Kek, played for NK Maribor during the early 1960s, earning 51 appearances for the club and scoring one goal in the process. His son Matjaž is also a footballer.

Managerial statistics

Honours

Player
Maribor
Slovenian PrvaLiga: 1996–97, 1997–98, 1998–99
Slovenian Cup: 1996–97, 1998–99

Manager
Maribor
Slovenian PrvaLiga: 1999–2000, 2002–03
Slovenian Cup: 2003–04

Rijeka
Croatian First League: 2016–17
Croatian Cup: 2013–14, 2016–17
Croatian Super Cup: 2014

References

1961 births
Living people
Sportspeople from Maribor
Yugoslav footballers
Slovenian footballers
Slovenia international footballers
Association football defenders
NK Železničar Maribor players
NK Maribor players
SV Spittal players
Grazer AK players
Austrian Football Bundesliga players
Slovenian PrvaLiga players
Slovenian expatriate footballers
Expatriate footballers in Austria
Slovenian expatriate sportspeople in Austria
Slovenian football managers
NK Maribor managers
Slovenia national football team managers
2010 FIFA World Cup managers
Ittihad FC managers
HNK Rijeka managers
Slovenian expatriate sportspeople in Croatia
Expatriate football managers in Croatia
Slovenian expatriate football managers
Croatian Football League managers